Adheko Ghume is an album by Bangladeshi artist Shayan Chowdhury Arnob released in 2012. It is a collection of his renditions of twelve Rabindra Sangeet.

Track list

References 

2012 albums
Bangladeshi music albums